Jacob Daniel Biamonte (born January 22, 1979) is an American physicist and theoretical computer scientist active in the fields of quantum information theory and quantum computing. He is currently a professor at the Skolkovo Institute of Science and Technology.

Biamonte contributed several universality proofs which established the first experimentally relevant universal models of adiabatic quantum computation.  He also proved universality of the NISQ era variational model of quantum computation and published several results in the development of quantum machine learning and the mathematics of tensor networks.

Education 

Biamonte completed a Ph.D. at the University of Oxford in 2010. In 2022 he defended a thesis for Russia's Doctor of Physical and Mathematical Sciences at Moscow Institute of Physics and Technology.

Honors and awards 
In 2021 Biamonte became a Fellow of the Institute of Mathematics and its Applications. In 2018 Biamonte was awarded the USERN Medal in Formal Sciences for his work on quantum algorithms.  In 2014 Biamonte became an invited member of the Foundational Questions Institute.

References

External links
 Laboratory for Quantum Information Processing at the Skolkovo Institute of Science and Technology
 

1979 births
Living people
20th-century American mathematicians
20th-century American physicists
21st-century American mathematicians
21st-century American physicists
Mathematical physicists
Quantum physicists
Quantum information scientists